Richard Valentine Morris (March 8, 1768 – May 13, 1815) was a United States Navy officer and politician.

Early life
He was born on March 8, 1768, in Morrisania, then a town in Westchester County, which became in 1898 a neighborhood in the borough of the Bronx, New York City.  He was one of ten children born to Lewis Morris (1726–1798), a signer of the Declaration of Independence, and Mary Walton (1727–1794), a member of a well-known merchant family.

His uncles included Staats Long Morris, Richard Morris, the Chief Justice of the New York Supreme Court, and Gouverneur Morris, a United States Senator from New York.  His grand-uncle was Robert Hunter Morris, a Chief Justice of the New Jersey Supreme Court, and his great-grandfather was Colonial Governor Lewis Morris.  His aunt, Helena Magdalena Morris (1762–1840), was married to John Rutherfurd (1760–1840), a United States Senator from New Jersey who served from 1791 to 1798.

Career
At the reduction of the US Navy after the war with France, Morris was retained as fifth in rank and recalled to command the Mediterranean Squadron in 1802 during the First Barbary War.

Recalled to the United States, Morris faced a court of inquiry which decided that he had not "discovered due diligence and activity in annoying the enemy".

On May 16, 1804, Secretary of the Navy Robert Smith, with the agreement of President Thomas Jefferson, revoked his captaincy in the U.S. Navy and dismissed him from the service.  Morris had brought his wife and young son on board with him and was accused of taking actions "more reflective of a concerned husband and father than a military commander in the midst of a war."  In 1804, he published A Defence of the Conduct of Commodore Morris During His Command in the Mediterranean, as a defense to the actions he took while in command of the Mediterranean.

Political career
From July 1, 1813 until June 30, 1814, Morris was a Federalist member of the New York State Assembly (Westchester Co.), serving in the 37th New York State Legislature.

Personal life
On January 24, 1797, Morris was married to Anne Walton (1773–1858). Together, they were the parents of:

 Lewis Morris (1797–1798), who died young.
 Gerard Walton Morris (1799–1865), who married Martha Pine in 1827.
 Richard Valentin Morris, Jr. (1803–1843), who died unmarried.
 Henry Morris (1805–1854), who married Mary Natalie Spencer (1810–1886), daughter of John Canfield Spencer, in 1831.

Morris died in May 1815 in New York City.

References
Notes

Sources

 A Narrative of the Official Conduct of Valentine Morris, Esq.: Late Captain General, Governor in Chief of the Island of St. Vincent and its Dependencies by Richard Valentine Morris
 A Defence of the Conduct of Commodore Morris During His Command in the Mediterranean: With Strictures on The Report of the Court of Enquiry Held at Washington by Richard Valentine Morris

1768 births
1815 deaths
Morris family (Morrisania and New Jersey)
American people of Dutch descent
United States Navy officers
Continental Navy officers
Members of the New York State Assembly
New York (state) Federalists
19th-century American naval officers